Hiero or hieron ("holy place") is a holy shrine, temple, or temple precinct in ancient Greece.

Hiero may also refer to:

Places and jurisdictions 
 Hieron, Caria, an Ancient city and former bishopric in Asia Minor, now Avsarkale is Turkey and Catholic titular see Hieron

People

Ancient
 Hiero I, tyrant of Syracuse, Italy (478–467 BC)
 Hiero (Xenophon), a dialogue by Xenophon about Hiero I
 Hiero II of Syracuse, tyrant of Syracuse (270–215 BC)
 Hieron (potter), a 5th-century BC potter associated with Makron (vase painter)

Modern
 Hiero., the author abbreviation for botanist Georg Hans Emmo Wolfgang Hieronymus
 Jay Hieron (born 1976), an American professional mixed martial arts fighter

Fictional
 Hiero Desteen, protagonist of two post-apocalypse novels by Sterling E. Lanier (Hiero's Journey and The Unforsaken Hiero)

Other 
 Any one of a number of Aero-engines built to the designs of Otto Hieronimus in the Austro-Hungarian empire from the early 1910s, such as the Hiero E
 Hieroglyphics (group), a hip-hop group
 Hiéron du Val d'Or, a French Catholic esoteric society

See also 
 
 
 Hieros (disambiguation)

 Hiro (disambiguation)
 Hero (disambiguation)